Didier Chrispeels (born 26 February 1958), better known as Crisse, is a Belgian comic-strip artist from Brussels.

References 

Belgian comics writers
1958 births
Living people